Monstrosity is an American death metal band which originated in Fort Lauderdale, Florida, during the Florida death metal scene of the early 1990s.

History 
Vocalist George "Corpsegrinder" Fisher and drummer Lee Harrison and bass player Mark Van Erp were the founders of Monstrosity. Harrison had just left the band Malevolent Creation and George Fisher gave up a band in his hometown of Maryland and came to Florida in 1990. Jon Rubin who had played guitar in Malevolent Creation also joined to form Monstrosity. Mark Van Erp played bass in the band Cynic and he left Cynic to join Monstrosity. The four members of Monstrosity signed with Nuclear Blast (Germany). Jason Gobel who was a member of Cynic helped Monstrosity record Imperial Doom when they entered the recording studio. He was never a member of Monstrosity. The album was released in 1992 by Nuclear Blast. Monstrosity toured Europe in support of the band Pestilence for this album.

After a number of problems with the label, Lee Harrison formed his own music label, Conquest Music, in 1996.
Now signed to Conquest Music, the band entered the studio again to record Millennium. Guitarist Jon Rubin was replaced by Jason Morgan and bassist Mark Van Erp, by Kelly Conlon. George "Corpsegrinder" Fisher performed vocals and Lee Harrison was on drums. The album was licensed to Nuclear Blast Germany in 1996 for Europe and later re-released in 2002 by Hammerheart Records (Netherlands) for Europe. After completing the recording of the album Millennium, Fisher joined Cannibal Corpse. Jason Avery (Eulogy) replaced Fisher on vocals.

In 1999, Monstrosity went back in the studio and this time they recorded In Dark Purity. The album was produced by Monstrosity and recorded at Morrisound Studios, Tampa, Florida. Conquest Music licensed the album to Olympic/Slip Disc/Century Media for better distribution in the US and licensed the album to Metal Age and then Hammerheart Records in Europe. Jason Avery was the vocalist, Lee Harrison, the drummer, Tony Norman, the guitarist and Kelly Conlon, the bassist.
In 2001, Conquest Music released a two-CD Monstrosity package. One CD was a live album Monstrosity recorded while on tour in the US. Included in the CD was Monstrosity's infamous Horror Infinity demo and their Slaves and Masters demo. CD two features slightly different re-recordings of songs from their first album. The double CD was licensed to Hammerheart Records in Europe.

By 2004, Monstrosity was in the process of recording Rise to Power with members Jason Avery (vocalist), Lee Harrison (drums), Tony Norman (guitar), Sam Molina (guitar) and Mike Poggione (bass). The album was recorded at Audio Hammer Studio, Sanford, Florida. It was produced by Lee Harrison and Monstrosity and engineered by Jason Suecof. Conquest Music licensed the album to Metal Blade Records in Europe. Monstrosity toured the US in support of the album and they were invited by the Bogotá, Colombia government to headline a musical festival in Bogotá. 85,000 people were in attendance.

Avery was replaced in December 2005 by Brian Werner (Infernaeon). Werner performed vocal duties on the band's 2006 European tour, and subsequent U.S. shows.
In December 2006, Werner was replaced by Mike Hrubovcak (Divine Rapture, Imperial Crystalline Entombment, Vile) and Mark English (guitar) joined Monstrosity. Monstrosity is now Mike Hrubovcak (vocals), Lee Harrison (drums), Mark English (guitar) and Mike Poggione (bass). They returned to Morrisound Studios. This time to record Spiritual Apocalypse. Conquest Music licensed the album to Metal Blade in Europe and it was released in 2007. Additional solos on Spiritual Apocalypse were done by Matt LaPorte (Jon Oliva's Pain). The ending solo on "Bloodline Horror" was performed by Jason Suecof and James Malone. Back-up vocals on "Inhuman Race" and "Firestorm" were provided by Kelly Schaefer of Atheist. The album was released in the US in 2008.

In the summer of 2009, Monstrosity spent six weeks touring Peru and Chile and then flew to Europe to do the Brutal Assault festival in Czech Republic and Party San festival in Germany. On November 22, 2011, the band announced in their Facebook that they were to release a live DVD, Live Apocalypse, in early 2012. On October 2, 2015, the band played its first show in Central Florida for nearly fifteen years at West End Trading Company in Sanford Florida. During the show it was announced that the band had begun writing a new record. Released on September 7, 2018 was the band's sixth and first studio album in eleven years, The Passage of Existence.

Band members

Current members
 Lee Harrison – drums (1990–present)
 Mike Poggione – bass (2001–present)
 Mark English – guitars (2006–present)
 Mike Hrubovcak – vocals (2006–present)
 Matt Barnes – guitars (2010–present)

Former members
 Jon Rubin – guitars (1990–1994)
 Mark van Erp – bass (1990–1995)
 George "Corpsegrinder" Fisher – vocals 
 Tony Norman – guitars (1999–2005)
 Jason "Tux" Morgan – guitars (1994–1999)
 Kelly Conlon – bass (1995–1999)
 Sam Molina – guitars (2003–2006), vocals 
 Jason Avery – vocals (1996–2001, 2003–2005) 

Touring members
 Pat O'Brien – guitars (1996–1997)
 Jay Fernandez – guitars (1998-1999)
 Bobby Earl – vocals (2001)
 Patrick Hall – guitars (2002)
 Brian Werner – vocals (2006)
 J.J. Hrubovcak – guitars (2007)
 Ben Kuzay – bass (2008)
 Andrew Guthrie - bass (2012)
 Jamie Harris - guitars (1998)
 Jamie Osburne - guitars (1998)
 Matt Moore - guitars (2009)
 Steve Bailey - guitars (2000)
 Chuck Amos - guitars (1994)
 Adam Bollenbach - guitars (1993)
 Jason Gobel - guitars (1991)

Timeline

Discography

Studio albums
Imperial Doom (1992)
Millennium (1996)
In Dark Purity (1999)
Rise to Power (2003)
Spiritual Apocalypse (2007)
The Passage of Existence (2018)

EPs and singles
Burden of Evil (1991)
Darkest Dream (1992)

Compilations
Enslaving the Masses (2001)

Live albums
Live Extreme Brazilian - Tour 2002 (2003)
10 Years of Nuclear Blast (1997)
Stages Of Decay (2001)

DVDs
Live Apocalypse (2012)

Demo albums
Horror Infinity (1990)
Slaves And Masters (1994)

External links
Official website
Interview at Swampfoot Records
Monstrosity at Encyclopaedia Metallum
Monstrosity on Myspace
Monstrosity on Facebook

1990 establishments in Florida
American technical death metal musical groups
Death metal musical groups from Florida
Metal Blade Records artists
Musical groups established in 1990
Musical groups from Fort Lauderdale, Florida
Musical quintets